Douglas "Dodo" R.A. Cagas (December 3, 1943 – June 10, 2021) was a Filipino politician and a representative of the first district of the Philippine province of Davao del Sur. He later served as governor of Davao del Sur from 2007 to 2013 and again from 2016 until his death.

Biography
A member of the well-known Cagas clan, Cagas was an important and controversial personality within the Mindanao political movement. He began his political career in the early 1980s as a member of the Regular National Assembly of his province, and then became a member of the House of Representatives between 1998 and 2007. At the end of his term as representative, he was elected governor of Davao del Sur, a position he held until 2013 and again from 2016 until his death. Accused of being the instigator of the murder of journalist Nestor Bedolido in Digos in 2010, four years later, Cagas surrendered to law enforcement after an arrest warrant was issued against him. Released from prison in 2016, he was then accused by Senator Leila de Lima, along with her son and Arrel Olaño, of having appropriated approximately 9.3 million pesos through the pork barrel system during his mandate as representative.

Personal life and death
Cagas was married to Chinese-Filipino Mercedes Chan Cagas, with whom he had a son, Marc. Both have in turn entered the politics.

Cagas died from complications of COVID-19 on June 10, 2021, at the Digos Medical Center, where he had been hospitalized for three weeks.

References

1944 births
2021 deaths
Governors of Davao del Sur
Members of the House of Representatives of the Philippines from Davao del Sur
PDP–Laban politicians
Deaths from the COVID-19 pandemic in the Philippines
Filipino politicians convicted of crimes